Kusilvak Census Area, formerly known as Wade Hampton Census Area, is a census area located in the U.S. state of Alaska. As of the 2020 census, the population was 8,368, up from 7,459 in 2010. It is part of the Unorganized Borough and therefore has no borough seat. Its largest community is the city of Hooper Bay, on the Bering Sea coast.

The census area's per capita income makes it the fourth-poorest county-equivalent in the United States.  In 2014, it had the highest percentage of unemployed people of any county or census area in the United States, at 23.7 percent.

Name
The census area was originally named for Wade Hampton III, a South Carolina politician whose son-in-law, John Randolph Tucker, a territorial judge in Nome, posthumously named a mining district in western Alaska for him in 1913. The district eventually became the census area, retaining its name. Over the next century, the name became increasingly controversial, with Native residents and others arguing Hampton's name did not represent Alaska and that his personal history as a slave-holding Civil War general was a blemish on the region. In July 2015, Alaska Governor Bill Walker formally notified the U.S. Census Bureau that the census area was being renamed after the Kusilvak Mountains, its highest range.

Geography

Adjacent boroughs and census areas
 Nome Census Area, Alaska – north
 Yukon–Koyukuk Census Area, Alaska – east
 Bethel Census Area, Alaska – south

National protected area
 Yukon Delta National Wildlife Refuge (part)
 Andreafsky Wilderness (part)

Demographics

As of the census of 2000, there were 7,028 people, 1,602 households, and 1,296 families residing in the census area.  The population density was 0.35 people per square mile (0/km2).  There were 2,063 housing units at an average density of /sq mi (0/km2).  The racial makeup of the census area was 92.53% Native American, 4.74% White, 0.06% Black or African American, 0.10% Asian, 0.03% Pacific Islander, 0.03% from other races, and 2.52% from two or more races.  0.33% of the population were Hispanic or Latino of any race. 50.00% of the population reported speaking English at home, while 49.75% spoke Central Alaskan Yup'ik.

In the 2006 American community survey, the Kusilvak Census Area had the largest increase in Hispanic population since 2000 with a 1572.73% increase.

There were 1,602 households, out of which 59.70% had children under the age of 18 living with them, 47.40% were married couples living together, 20.30% had a female householder with no husband present, and 19.10% were non-families. Sixteen percent of all households were made up of individuals, and 1.80% had someone living alone who was 65 years of age or older.  The average household size was 4.38 and the average family size was 4.95.

In the census area the population was spread out, with 46.60% under the age of 18 (the highest such percentage among county equivalents in the United States), 9.70% from 18 to 24, 25.60% from 25 to 44, 13.10% from 45 to 64, and 5.00% who were 65 years of age or older.  The median age was 20 years, making the Census Area the youngest county in the United States. For every 100 females, there were 109.00 males.  For every 100 females age 18 and over, there were 107.70 males.

The census area's per capita income makes it one of the poorest places in the United States.

2020 Census

Communities

Cities

Alakanuk
Chevak
Emmonak
Hooper Bay
Kotlik
Marshall
Mountain Village
Nunam Iqua (formerly Sheldon Point)
Pilot Station
Russian Mission
Scammon Bay
St. Mary's

Census-designated place
Pitkas Point

Unincorporated Communities
Bill Moore's Slough
Chuloonawick
Hamilton
Ohogamiut

See also

 
List of mountain peaks of Alaska

References

External links

 Census Area map: Alaska Department of Labor

 
Alaska census areas
Bering Sea